Cut Memey (born December 7, 1980) is an Indonesian model and television host.

Memey married and later divorced Jacksen Peranginangin. She has a daughter named Anshita Lorenza Agustine.

Filmography
 Film Horor (2007)
 Mau Dong Ah (2009)
 Emak Ingin Naik Haji (2009)
 Safa & Marwah (2009)
 Cinta 7 Susun (2013)

References

External links

 Cut Memey Official Site 
 
 "Cut Memey Takut Kualat." Kaltim Post. June 28, 2010.

1980 births
Acehnese people
Living people
Indonesian female models
Indonesian television personalities